Nellie Dick (born Naomi Ploschansky; 15 May 1893 – 31 October 1995) was an anarchist educator and for 40 years was at the forefront of the Modern Schools movement. Alongside her husband, Jim Dick, she worked at the American Modern Schools in Stelton, Mohegan and Lakewood.

Biography 
Dick was born Naomi Ploschansky to a Jewish family near Kyiv on 15 May 1893, she was one of eight children. While an infant her family moved to Whitechapel in the East End of London, then Leeds, Glasgow, and finally Stepney Green in London. Her father was active in the Jewish trade union and anarchist movements and worked as a baker and a capmaker.

From 1907 until 1911 Dick organised a Sunday school at the Jubilee Street Anarchist Club, and in 1912 opened the Ferrer Sunday School in Whitechapel. In 1913 on a May Day march she met Jim Dick, an educator who had started a Ferrer school in Liverpool, and he subsequently joined her school as a co-director of the Sunday school. They married in 1915 so he could avoid conscription and then moved to the United States in 1917. Her family moved to Russia after the revolution, with her sister Bertha later spending 15 years in a prison camp.

From 1917 until 1924 Nellie and Jim Dick both worked at the modern school in Stelton, New Jersey. From 1924 until 1928 Nellie and Jim Dick directed the Mohegan Modern School in Mohegan, New York. From 1928 until 1933 they were co-principals at Stelton. In 1933 they founded their own school in Lakewood, New Jersey, which they ran until it closed in 1958 – the last of the American Modern Schools to close.

She retired with Jim to Miami, Florida, with Jim dying in 1965. In her retirement she was active in the senior citizens movement. In 1990 Dick moved to Oyster Bay, New York where she died on the 31st of October 1995, aged 102.

Bibliography

References

Interviews 

 
 
 
 
 

Jewish anarchists
Ferrer Center and Colony
British anarchists
People from Kyiv Oblast
1893 births
Women centenarians
British centenarians
1995 deaths
Jewish educators
British women educators
20th-century British educators
Founders of schools in the United States
20th-century American educators
American women educators
American centenarians